Carri Hicks is an American politician who has served in the Oklahoma Senate from the 40th district since 2018.

Prior to running for political office, Hicks was an elementary schoolteacher. She defeated business consultant Daniel Ezell in the Democratic Party primary held in June 2018, then won the general election against Republican candidate Joe Howell and political independent Christopher Hensley. Hicks was sworn into office on November 14, 2018.

References

External links

Living people
Democratic Party Oklahoma state senators
21st-century American politicians
21st-century American women politicians
Oklahoma City University alumni
Capella University alumni
Schoolteachers from Oklahoma
Women state legislators in Oklahoma
21st-century American women educators
21st-century American educators
Politicians from Oklahoma City
Year of birth missing (living people)